ROC at the Olympics may refer to:

 Republic of China at the Olympics (1924–1976)
 Republic of China (Taiwan), or Chinese Taipei at the Olympics (1984–present)
 Russian Olympic Committee:
Russian Olympic Committee at the Olympics
Russian Olympic Committee athletes at the 2020 Summer Olympics
Russian Olympic Committee athletes at the 2022 Winter Olympics